Moreschi is an Italian surname that may refer to the following:

Alessandro Moreschi, the last of the castrati
Gabriela Gonçalves Dias Moreschi (born 1994), Brazilian handballer 
Luigia Polzelli, born Luigia Moreschi (1760-1830), Joseph Haydn's mistress
Sandra Moreschi (born 1946), Italian designer of Jewish ceremonial art